Claudio Chiappucci (born 28 February 1963 in Uboldo, Varese, Lombardy) is a retired Italian professional cyclist. He was on the podium three times in the Tour de France general classification: second in 1990, third in 1991 and second again in 1992.

Career
After a quiet start to his career he burst onto the scene in the 1990 Tour de France. Chiappucci found himself almost casually wearing the yellow jersey after a stage one attack which the favourites allowed him to arrive with a 10-minute time advantage. In subsequent stages he resisted the return of Greg LeMond, only losing the lead of the race in stage 20, the final time trial. In the end, LeMond won the Tour by 2' 16", Chiappucci came home with a surprising second place and, moreover, the status of a cycling star. He was the first Italian cyclist to arrive on the podium at the Tour since Felice Gimondi in 1972. This first successful campaign highlighted Chiappucci's main weakness, the time trial. Although vowing to return the following year as a better racer against the clock, Chiappucci never was able to master this discipline.

The year of 1991 confirmed to the cycling community that Chiappucci was able to perform consistently. Beginning with a win in the opening classic of the season, the Milan San-Remo, Chiappucci rode the Giro d'Italia and the Tour of France.

However, Chiappucci declined quickly. After riding a solid Giro it looked like his 1993 Tour de France was to be a big showdown with Miguel Induráin. But from the first mountain stage Chiappucci was obviously struggling. Although he had a revival later on in the race, Chiappucci finished sixth overall. He won the Clásica de San Sebastián a few weeks after the Tour de France, but this marked the end of his major results. His level of performance declined sharply from around 1994/1995, and he retired in 1998 after suspicions of doping in 1997.

His most famous victory was stage 13 of the 1992 Tour de France, when he attacked on the first climb of the day, 245 km from the finish, and arrived in Sestriere after holding off a thrilling chase by Miguel Induráin and Gianni Bugno. On that occasion Pascal Lino was holding the yellow jersey, but it was one of the first major mountain stages and was anticipated to lose it to the GC contenders. Induráin, Roche, LeMond, Delgado, Bugno and Induráin were all ahead of Chiappucci who was in 7th overall.
Chiappucci risked everything by joining the early breakaway that no other GC riders were willing to enter. He dropped the other breakaway riders before the first summit and rode on a solo attack for 125 kilometers. He was alone on top of all five main climbs, of which 3 were "première catégorie" and 1 "hors catégorie". By end of the stage he had jumped to 2nd place overall about ninety seconds behind Induráin. He had wanted to replicate the same accomplishment as Fausto Coppi exactly 40 years earlier.

Among the awards received by Chiappucci is a silver medal earned in 1994 at the World Cycling Championship in Sicily.

Not gifted with an exceptional physique, Chiappucci was distinguished by a gritty, combative style, always ready to attack; he did not hold back in the face of any climb or time trial.

Doping
Claudio Chiappucci used the services of doctor Francesco Conconi, who is accused of applying EPO to cyclists. Conconi was found 'morally guilty', but not convicted, because the statute of limitations had expired. The judge had looked at medical reports of 33 cyclists in the period from 1993 to 1995, including Chiappucci's, and all blood tests showed largely fluctuating hematocrit-values, indicative for EPO-use.
In 1997, Claudio Chiappucci told prosecutor Vincenzo Scolastico that he had been using EPO since 1993, but later he retracted that statement.

Career achievements

Major results

1982
 1st  Road race, National Amateur Road Championships
1984
 2nd Piccolo Giro di Lombardia
1987
 1st Stage 3 (TTT) Giro d'Italia
 2nd Giro di Toscana
 8th Paris–Tours
1988
 2nd Trofeo Luis Puig
 7th Gran Premio Città di Camaiore
 9th Giro di Lombardia
1989
 1st Giro del Piemonte
 1st Coppa Placci
 2nd Overall Giro del Trentino
 3rd Rund um den Henninger Turm
 6th Tre Valli Varesine
 8th La Flèche Wallonne
1990
 1st  Mountains classification Giro d'Italia
 1st Stage 4 Settimana Internazionale di Coppi e Bartali
 2nd Overall Tour de France
Held  after Stages 12–19
 2nd Tre Valli Varesine
 3rd Züri-Metzgete
 3rd Giro del Friuli
 4th Wincanton Classic
 4th Grand Prix des Amériques
 5th Overall Giro del Trentino
 6th UCI Road World Cup
 7th Overall Paris–Nice
1st Stage 6
1991
 1st  Overall Tour of the Basque Country
1st Stage 3
 1st Milan–San Remo
 Setmana Catalana de Ciclisme
1st Stages 4a & 4b
 2nd Overall Giro d'Italia
1st  Points classification
 2nd Overall Vuelta a Murcia
 3rd Overall Tour de France
1st  Mountains classification
1st Stage 13
Combativity award Overall
 3rd Road race, National Road Championships
 3rd La Flèche Wallonne
 3rd Giro dell'Appennino
 3rd Giro del Friuli
 4th Overall Giro del Trentino
 4th Tre Valli Varesine
 9th Wincanton Classic
1992
 1st  Overall Giro del Trentino
1st Stage 3
 1st Giro dell'Appennino
 1st Subida a Urkiola
 2nd Overall Tour de France
1st  Mountains classification
1st Stage 13
Combativity award Overall
 2nd Overall Giro d'Italia
1st  Mountains classification
 2nd Overall Clásico RCN
1st Stage 1
 2nd Giro di Lombardia
 2nd Clásica de San Sebastián
 2nd Coppa Placci
 2nd Rund um den Henninger Turm
 4th Wincanton Classic
 7th UCI Road World Cup

1993

 1st Clásica de San Sebastián
 1st Japan Cup
 1st Coppa Sabatini
 1st Cronoscalata della Futa-Memorial Gastone Nencini
 2nd Overall Tour de Romandie
 2nd Overall Giro del Trentino
 2nd Overall Escalada a Montjuïc
 2nd GP du Canton d'Argovie
 2nd Subida a Urkiola
 2nd Giro del Friuli
 3rd Overall Giro d'Italia
1st  Mountains classification
1st Stage 14
 3rd La Flèche Wallonne
 3rd Giro dell'Emilia
 3rd Giro del Veneto
 4th Giro di Lombardia
 4th Tre Valli Varesine
 5th Overall Volta a Catalunya
 5th UCI Road World Cup
 6th Overall Tour de France
1st Stage 17
 6th Liège–Bastogne–Liège
 7th Züri-Metzgete
 10th Overall Tour of the Basque Country
1994
 1st  Overall Volta a Catalunya
1st Stage 4
 1st Tre Valli Varesine
 1st Japan Cup
 2nd Overall Tour of Galicia
1st Stage 3
 2nd Overall Escalada a Montjuïc
 2nd  Road race, UCI Road World Championships
 2nd Giro di Lombardia
 2nd Subida a Urkiola
 2nd Giro dell'Appennino
 3rd Overall Tour of the Basque Country
 4th UCI Road World Cup
 4th Liège–Bastogne–Liège
 4th Züri-Metzgete
 5th Overall Giro d'Italia
 5th Overall Critérium International
 7th Overall Tirreno–Adriatico
 7th Amstel Gold Race
 7th La Flèche Wallonne
 8th Giro dell'Emilia
 8th Coppa Bernocchi
 9th Overall Giro del Trentino
1995
 1st  Overall Escalada a Montjuïc
1st Stage 1a
 1st Giro del Piemonte
 1st Japan Cup
 1st Cronoscalata della Futa-Memorial Gastone Nencini
 3rd Subida a Urkiola
 4th Overall Giro d'Italia
 4th Tour of Flanders
 6th Giro di Lombardia
 7th Overall Tour de Romandie
 7th Liège–Bastogne–Liège
 8th Overall Vuelta a Murcia
 8th Milan–San Remo
 9th GP Ouest–France
1996
 3rd GP Industria & Artigianato di Larciano
 3rd Coppa Sabatini
 3rd Grand Prix de Fourmies
 10th GP Ouest–France
1997
 2nd Overall Giro di Sardegna
 2nd Overall Settimana Internazionale di Coppi e Bartali
 6th Tour of Flanders
 9th GP Ouest–France
 10th Rund um den Henninger Turm
1998
 8th Overall Tirreno–Adriatico
10th Coppa Placci

Grand Tour general classification results timeline

See also
List of doping cases in cycling

Notes

External links
Palmares 
Claudio Chiappucci dans le Tour de France 

Italian male cyclists
Doping cases in cycling
Cyclists from the Province of Varese
1963 births
Living people